

Churches 

St.Mary's Shrine(Jubilee Shrine) also Known as Pala Kurishupally a shrine located at the centre of the Pala town, acts as the landmark of the town. St. Thomas Syro-Malabar Catholic Cathedral, Pala and St. Mary's Syro-Malabar Catholic Church, Lalam are two of the main Syrian Catholic churches in Pala.

A famous pilgrim centre nearby is the Alphonsa Church at Bharananganam, where the mortal remains of St. Alphonsa of India are kept. Adjacent to it is St. Mary's Syro-Malabar Catholic Church of Bharananganam which was founded in 1002. St. George's Syro-Malabar Catholic Church, Aruvithura is also a famous pilgrim centre. Another Christian pilgrim centre near Pala is the St. Augustine's Syro-Malabar Catholic Church at Ramapuram, where the mortal remains of the Blessed Thevarparampil Kunjachan are kept. Monastery of Mutholy was founded by Saint Kuriakose Elias Chavara.

St. Thomas Church at Arunapuram is one of the Syro-Malabar Catholic Churches, which has the largest number of convents in Pala Diocese. Two main colleges of Pala comes under the area of this church.

Though Pala has been a traditional stronghold of the Syro Malabar Catholic Christians, who are generally very conservative in faith and beliefs, the town has, of late witnessed the emergence of a few Evangelical/ Pentecostal churches in and around the region. Few Latin Catholic churches can also be seen in the place. The other denominations of the Syrian Christians are largely absent in Pala.

Temples 
There are 11 temples in Pala Municipality. Among them Lalam Mahadeva Temple is among the most famous and is called Dakshina Kasi (Kasi of South). Lalam Mahadeva Temple is situated at the heart of Pala town on the bank of Lalam River. Kadappattor Mahadeva Temple which is situated on the bank of Meenachil River is the most famous Hindu temple in this region. Kizhathadiyoor Puthiyakavu Devi Temple, Chembittambalam Kizhathadiyoor Thrukkayil Mahadeva Temple, Murikkumpuzha Devi Temple, Idayattu Bala Ganapathy Temple, Narasimha Swami Temple, Vellappattu Sree Vana Durga Bhagavathy Temple, Thattarakathu Bhagavathy Temple, Ooraasala Subrahmanya Swami Temple and Anakkulangara Bhagavathy Temple, Kochidappady Sree Shanmugha Swami Temple are the other temples situated within the boundaries of Pala Municipality.

Pala, Kerala